The islands of Chile encompass the various islands that the government of Chile has sovereignty over. By far the majority of these are the islands in the south of the country.

Classifications vary for isla ("island"), islote ("islet"), roquerío ("rocks"), farallón ("cliff") and archipiélago or grupo ("archipelago").

Island territory

Units by region
Units by region, according to last update of 2019:

Ocean islands

River and lake islands
Guapi of Ranco Lake
Isla del Rey
Isla Teja
Malvinas
Orrego

Phantom islands
Elizabeth Island, Bodesta, Pactolus Bank and some reefs have been mentioned in the past as lying near Chilean territories but they are phantom islands. Gable Island is listed by National Geospatial-Intelligence Agency, Country Files (GNS) as a Chilean Island, but it is actually part of Argentina.

Literature islands
Several reports, novels and tales have the islands of Chile as geographic background:

 The Narrative of the Honourable John Byron by John Byron
 The Survivors of the "Jonathan" by Jules Verne
 El último grumete de la Baquedano by Francisco Coloane
 The Golden Ocean by Patrick O'Brian
 The Unknown Shore by Patrick O'Brian
 Robinson Crusoe of Daniel Defoe

 Two Years' Vacation by Jules Verne
 The Voyage of the Beagle by Charles Darwin
 Benito Cereno by Herman Melville
 The Ice Limit by Douglas Preston and Lincoln Child, on Desolacion Island
 Hawaii by James Michener, on Desolacion Island
 The German poet Adelbert von Chamisso wrote a poem about Sala y Gomez Island based on his reflections upon visiting the island in 1816.
 Ishmael, in Herman Melville's classic novel, Moby Dick, recalls a marble tablet at a whalemen's chapel in New Bedford which pays homage to a whaleman named John Talbot who lost his life whaling "near the Isle of Desolation, off Patagonia". This recollection occurs in Chapter 7, "The Chapel".

See also
 
 Fjords and channels of Chile
 Archipelagoes of Patagonia
 Geography of Chile
 List of Chile-related topics

References

External links

Islands of Chile @ United Nations Environment Programme 

World island information @ WorldIslandInfo.com

 
Islands
Islands
Chile

es:Anexo:Islas de Chile
it:Lista di isole del Cile
ka:ჩილეს კუნძულების სია
xmf:ჩილეშ კოკეფიშ ერკებული